Blades in the Dark is a tabletop fantasy role-playing game by John Harper, set in a fictional city of Doskvol, inspired by Victorian London and Gothic fiction. The game was crowdfunded on Kickstarter in 2015, raising US$179,280 from 3,925 backers.

Description
The default setting of Blades in the Dark, Doskvol, is a roughly 19th century level of technology combined with urban fantasy. An industrial world under perpetual night, long after some great catastrophe has relegated the sun to storybooks, and resulted in the ghosts of the dead lingering in the world. Players take the role of members of a criminal organization such as thieves, smugglers, or merchants of some illicit goods, and grind their way up the criminal underworld by seizing money, territory and infamy.

Mechanics
Player characters are chosen from a selection of broad character archetypes each with their own playbook, and each playbook has their own triggers for further character advancement points based on actions taken in play, encouraging the player to play the characters in a way that fits the narrative archetype.  For example, the mechanist/alchemist character type the Leech receives additional points when addressing their challenges with technical skill, while the fighter character type the Cutter receives additional points towards advancement for utilizing violence or threats.  

The players are unified around a shared crew or criminal enterprise, having its own communal character sheet.  The crew advances of its own in response to the player's abilities to accomplish capers and gain influence in the underworld providing a common set of boons to be invoked by the table.  The crew can gain territory, advance in organizational tiers and gain special abilities.  Just as the player characters have triggers for gaining advancement based on playing to their character type, the crew too encourages playing in a style befitting the narrative archetype of the criminal organization that they share. 

The basic conflict resolution mechanic is for players to roll a number of six-sided dice equal to the number of points in that character's matching action.  A success or failure criterion is always the same and determined by the highest individual number rolled. Special focus is given to the fictional position of the characters to perform a given action, with explicit division of authority between game masters and players giving the players the final say in what character stats are rolled to address a challenge, while the game master is tasked with assessing the strength of the player's position ranging from a dominant to a desperate position.  A strong position reduces the potential consequences of a player's failure, while a desperate position offers the players a chance at gaining points towards character advancement.  

The game elides the more granular aspects of combat simulation, instead taking a heavily player-facing approach. Harm generally befalls the players as a consequence of their actions, and little space is given for non-player characters to take mechanical initiative. As such NPCs do not require significant stat blocks and there is very little dice rolling on the part of the game master.  With no strict distinction between combat or any other task, all difficulty is largely handled in terms of the effect levels determined by the fictional position of the obstacle and players, whether outnumbered or outclassed.  Complexity is provided in negotiating the choice of an action to perform, the security of the position that roll has, and the special factors, such as weapon or tool quality, which the player can leverage in the task.

As is common to role playing games, characters advance mechanically through accumulation of experience, which is redeemed to either allow for the rolling of more dice when performing actions in the future, or offering up new special abilities largely providing the players with areas of increased narrative authority.  The game eschews hit points or any form of damage formula, providing a more flat trajectory for advancement when compared to traditional pen and paper RPGs.  As characters advance they become more likely to succeed, but make no well defined advances in their general ability to withstand injuries when inflicted or the degree of injuries they can inflict on others.  

The player characters have access to a mechanic which helps them to face challenges which is unavailable to non-player characters, the stress mechanic.  Players can elect to take stress to either improve their chances in taking action, to invoke some special actions or to reduce the consequences of actions.  The ability to take stress is limited though, and requires the indulging of a character specific vice such as drugs, worship, or settling some specific obligation to reduce during the downtime between criminal activities.  This downtime is mechanically distinct from the running of criminal scores, and is mandated to take place between scores.  Characters can manage their vice, the degree the local police are hunting them, search out leads, or follow player defined projects.  However should a player reach their limit for stress during a score, the character must take a trauma, a permanent change to the character as a consequence of their being pushed too far.  Trauma cannot be eliminated and should too many traumas be accumulated the character is no longer playable, either due to instability, disability or death.

Publication history
A crowd funding campaign began on March 9, 2015, against a goal of $7500.  Within one day the project had been fully funded.  Over the course of the one-month period of the campaign a further twenty three stretch goals were met, consisting of additional playbooks, campaign resources and full reskins of the game.  When the campaign ended on April 9, it had raised a total $179,280 from 3,925 backers.

Early access sales were opened for the digital version in early 2016 and the final version was released on January 30, 2017.

A Creative Commons licensed System Reference Document was released in December of 2017 and allows people to use the "Forged in the Dark" game system for other games.

Television Adaptation 
In 2021 it was announced that UK-based production company Warp Films signed a development deal with John Harper to produce a television series based on Blades in the Dark. Warp Films previously produced the This Is England series and a film adaption of Everybody's Talking About Jamie.

Reception
Winner of the 2015 Golden Geek RPG of the Year
Winner of the 2016 Indie RPG of the Year

References

External links
 Official home page

Tabletop games
Fantasy role-playing games
Indie role-playing games
Kickstarter-funded tabletop games
Role-playing games introduced in 2017